The Chatsbury/Bungonia bushfires of 1965 was a series of bushfires that burned from 5 to 14 March 1965 in the Southern Highlands region of New South Wales, Australia. The fires destroyed the villages of Tallong, Wingello, and most of the surrounding orchards.

The fire is thought to be ignited by a spark from a Chatsbury Station angle grinder.  It quickly spread and covered  and destroyed the areas' livestock.  It is thought to be the greatest disaster in the area.

Three people were killed. 28 homes were destroyed in Tallong, 31 in Wingello. The fire was eventually stopped (or burnt out) near Nowra on the NSW South Coast.

References

Bushfires in New South Wales
1965 fires in Oceania
1965 in Australia
1960s wildfires
1965 natural disasters
1960s in New South Wales
March 1965 events in Australia
1965 disasters in Australia